Kartar Singh  (born 7 October 1953) is an Indian wrestler who won gold medals at the Asian Games in 1978 and 1986. He stood 7th at the 1984 Summer Olympics – Men's freestyle 100 kg Wrestling.

Life
Kartar Singh was born in Sur Singh  village of the present-day Tarn Taran district in Punjab. He won gold medals in the 1978 Asian Games held in Bangkok and the 1986 Asian Games held in Seoul. He won a silver medal in the 1982 Asian Games held in Delhi. He won a bronze medal in the 1978 Commonwealth Games in Edmonton and a silver medal in the 1982 Commonwealth Games in Brisbane. Later he moved his residence to Jalandhar, where he worked as Superintendent of Police and as Director Sports of Punjab. Presently he is a master world champion in wrestling and retired as an Inspector General of Police in Punjab in the year 2013.

Awards and honors
In 1982 he received the Arjuna award and in 1987 he received the Padma Shri. Many times he won the Gold Medals in the Veterans World Championships held in Columbia in 1992, Toronto in 1993, Martiony (Switzerland) in 1997 and Bodex (France) in 1998.

References

External links
 

1953 births
Living people
Asian Games gold medalists for India
Recipients of the Padma Shri in sports
Recipients of the Arjuna Award
Sportspeople from Jalandhar
Olympic wrestlers of India
Wrestlers at the 1980 Summer Olympics
Wrestlers at the 1984 Summer Olympics
Wrestlers at the 1988 Summer Olympics
People from Tarn Taran Sahib
Commonwealth Games silver medallists for India
Commonwealth Games bronze medallists for India
Wrestlers at the 1978 Commonwealth Games
Wrestlers at the 1982 Commonwealth Games
Asian Games medalists in wrestling
Wrestlers at the 1978 Asian Games
Wrestlers at the 1982 Asian Games
Wrestlers at the 1986 Asian Games
Indian male sport wrestlers
Asian Games silver medalists for India
Commonwealth Games medallists in wrestling
Medalists at the 1978 Asian Games
Medalists at the 1982 Asian Games
Medalists at the 1986 Asian Games
Medallists at the 1978 Commonwealth Games
Medallists at the 1982 Commonwealth Games